The Wichita Aeros were an American minor league baseball franchise based in Wichita, Kansas, that played in the Triple-A American Association from 1970 through 1984.

The Aeros were established as an expansion franchise when the Association grew from six to eight clubs after the 1969 season. They were affiliated with the Cleveland Indians (1970–71), Chicago Cubs (1972–80), Texas Rangers (1981), Montreal Expos (1982–83) and Cincinnati Reds (1984). The Aeros led the league in attendance in 1970 and from 1972–74, but a series of last-place teams during their years as a Cubs farm club drove down attendance throughout the rest of the 1970s. The Aeros won only one division title, and no league championships, during their 15-year history. Milton Glickman, father of former US Secretary of Agriculture Dan Glickman and grandfather of film producer Jonathan Glickman, owned the team from 1970–1984. Glickman sold the team to Robert E. Rich Jr. in 1984.

On September 14, 1984, the Aeros were transferred to Buffalo, New York, and became the Buffalo Bisons, who are now members of the International League. The Bisons had existed in some form since the 1870s and (at the time playing at the Double-A level) used the Aeros' franchise to return to Triple-A baseball. In 1987, the Beaumont Golden Gators of the Double-A Texas League transferred to Wichita and remained there through the 2007 season as the Wranglers. The Wranglers moved to Springdale, Arkansas, in 2008. Wichita's current team is the Wind Surge of the Texas League. The Wingnuts of the independent league baseball incarnation of the American Association played in Wichita between 2008 and 2019.

Notable alumni

Buddy Bell
Tom Browning
Ray Burris
Bill Caudill
Chris Chambliss
Eric Davis
John Franco
Mark Gilbert
Larry Gura
Pete LaCock
John Lowenstein
Donnie Moore
Bill North
Paul Reuschel
Rick Reuschel
Richie Scheinblum
Lee Smith† 
Bruce Sutter †
Dick Tidrow
Don Werner

† – Member of the National Baseball Hall of Fame and Museum

References

Lloyd Johnson and Miles Wolff, editors. The Encyclopedia of Minor League Baseball, 1997 edition. Durham, North Carolina: Baseball America.

Baseball teams established in 1970
1984 disestablishments in Kansas
Chicago Cubs minor league affiliates
Cincinnati Reds minor league affiliates
Cleveland Guardians minor league affiliates
Defunct American Association (1902–1997) teams
Montreal Expos minor league affiliates
Professional baseball teams in Kansas
Aeros
Texas Rangers minor league affiliates
Defunct baseball teams in Kansas
1970 establishments in Kansas
Sports clubs disestablished in 1984